Dunia: Into a New World is a South Korean television entertainment program starring Yunho, Jung Hye-sung, Luda (Cosmic Girls), Kwon Hyun-bin, Sam Okyere, Don Spike, Koo Ja-sung, Hansel, Austin Kang, and DinDin. Season 1 aired on MBC Sundays at 18:45 (KST), beginning on 3 June and ended on 23 September 2018.

Dunia: Into a New World is dubbed as an "unreal variety show" because of its unconventional format, which follows a plot and incorporates scripted scenarios acted by the cast members. It is based on and is connected to Durango: Wild Lands, a massively multiplayer online role-playing game (MMORPG) created by Nexon.

Format 
The 10 cast members are trapped in a virtual world called Dunia and must find a way to survive using the items they have brought with them when they were transported to the island. In each episode, the show allows its viewers to decide what the cast must do in a certain situation by voting real-time through text messaging, which lasts for one minute.

Although the tasks and situations that the cast members encounter around Dunia are created by the producers, the way they handle each situation is unscripted, with the show indicating onscreen when they are acting on their own and when they are following a script. As with many video games, the show makes use of cutscenes when a major event happens.

Cast

Season 1

Episodes

Season 1

Original soundtrack

CD 1

CD 2

Ratings 

Season 1

Awards and nominations

References

External links

MBC TV original programming
South Korean television shows
2018 South Korean television series debuts
Korean-language television shows
South Korean variety television shows